Gelita AG is a manufacturer of gelatin and collagen peptides for the food, health and nutrition, pharmaceutical industries and for several technical applications. It is headquartered in Eberbach, Germany.

Founded in 1875, Gelita operates 21 production sites and 4 offices in North America, South America, Europe, South Africa, Asia, Australia and New Zealand. The plant in Sergeant Bluff, Iowa, is the largest gelatin factory in the world.

History 
The history of today's Gelita AG in Eberbach dates back to 1875, when the production of gelatin was started in Schweinfurt. Gelita was preceded by the founding of the "Gebrüder Köpff Company", Heinrich Koepff's small tannery, in 1883. Shaken by the economic crisis of the time, Heinrich saw a way out of his misery in gelatin production. The raw material for this could be purchased cheaply, as it was produced in the large tanneries as residual material. With around 60 employees, the factory was already producing photographic gelatin in 1884, which was an important material for the rapidly emerging photography in the 19th century. In 1887, the Koepff brothers acquired the competing company A. & C. Wolff in Heilbronn. Both locations had 320 employees who produced 400 tonnes of gelatin per year. In 1901, a major fire destroyed large parts of the factory. The brothers quarreled over reconstruction. Heinrich went to Heilbronn and Paul Koepff continued to run the rebuilt plant alone under the name Göppinger Gelatin Factory Paul Koepff. In 1911, he sold the factory to DGF AG, which already operated gelatin factories in Schweinfurt and Höchst. Paul Koepff was henceforth on the board of directors and continued to manage his former company as director. In 1929, Paul Koepff jr. took over the management of the Göppingen plant from his father, who died in 1953. The Gelita Brand was introduced in 1934. In 1937, the DGF was accused of violating foreign trade regulations and leading employees were arrested. Stoess, on the other hand, had reestablished relations with Eastman Kodak in the United States and was bringing large quantities of much-needed foreign exchange to Germany. After the World War II, Paul Koepff Jr. became managing director of the Stoess company in Eberbach. In 1949, he built up a gelatin capsule factory there. In the course of the decades, DGF AG bought various factories worldwide. In 1965, it was taken over by the "Chem. Werke Stoess" in Heidelberg. In that year Heinrich Koepff took over the majority of shares of the Göppingen plant and through his marriage to the granddaughter of the company founder, Gerda Stoess, the companies merged. In 1972, the association traded under the name DGF Stoess & Co. GmbH. In 1989, the company was converted into a public limited company. The gelatin production division was renamed the Gelita Group in 1999. In 2005, all entities started to sell gelatine under the brand name Gelita.

Products

Gelatin 
In 2021, Gelatin is a translucent, colorless, flavorless food ingredient, commonly derived from collagen taken from animal body parts. Gelita ranked second in the gelatin category of FoodTalks' Global Food Thickener Companies List.

Collagen peptides 
For oral supplementation in sectors like healthy aging, sports nutrition and beauty. Applications are for example food, drinks, cereals, bars and dietary supplements.

Fats, minerals and proteins 
Are produced when collagen proteins are manufactured. The main areas of application for Fat, Mineral and Protein Ingredients are human food, pet food and animal feed. The fats, for example, serve as energy sources. Proteins can improve the texture and hence the enjoyability and digestibility of foodstuffs and animal feed. Further applications are in technical areas and are used in the manufacture of bone china, construction molds, lubricants for machines and anti-rust agents.

Hemostats 
Hemostasis blood-staunching sponges for medical applications. They are used for injuries of the blood vessels to stop the bleeding for example during operations. Hemostats can be broken down by the body. For this reason, they remain in the body and the wound can stay closed.

Applications 
The products based on collagen proteins are used for food, health and nutrition, pharmaceutical industries and technical applications for example Photo, Ballistic, Restoration, Lubricants, Technical detergents.

Organisation 
Gelita AG is structured as a holding company. The group is controlled from the headquarter in Eberbach (Germany).

Production sites 

 West Krugersdorp, South Africa, Beef Hide
 Liaoyuan, China, Bone
 Pingyang, China, Pork Hide, Beef Hide
 Eberbach, (HQ), Germany, Beef Hide, Bone
 Göppingen, Germany, Pork Skin
 Memmingen, Germany, Bovine Bone Preparation
 Minden, Germany, Pork Skin
 Klippan, Scania, Sweden, Pork Skin
 Ter Apelkanaal, Netherlands, Pork Skin
 Ter Apelkanaal, Netherlands, Functional Proteins(Joint Venture)
 Sergeant Bluff, Iowa, United States, Pork Skin Plant
 Sergeant Bluff, Iowa, United States, Beef Hide Plant
 Sergeant Bluff, Iowa, United States, CP Plant
 Calumet City, Illinois, United States, Pork Skin
 Lerma, State of Mexico
 Leon, Mexico Pilsac (Joint Venture)
 Mococa, SP, Brasil, Beef Hide
 Cotia, Brasil, Milling/ Blending
 Maringá, Brasil, Beef Hide
 Beaudesert, Australia, Beef Hide
 Christchurch, New Zealand

Offices 
 Holmes Chapel, United Kingdom
 Shanghai, China
 Bangkok, Thailand
 Tokyo, Japan

Subsidiaries 
 Gelita Deutschland GmbH, Eberbach, Germany
 ATRO ProVita GmbH, Eberbach, Germany
 Gelita Health GmbH, Eberbach, Germany
 Gelita Medical GmbH, Eberbach, Germany

Publications 
 "Peptides Can Be Incorporated in the Diet While Maintaining Indispensable Amino Acid Balance", by Cristiana Paul, Suzane Leser and Steffen Oesser, 2019.
 "Oral Supplementation of Specific Collagen Peptides Combined with Calf-Strengthening Exercises Enhances Function and Reduces Pain in Achilles Tendinopathy Patients", Stephan F.E. Praet, Craig R. Purdam, Marijke Welvaert, Nicole Vlahovich, Gregg Lovell, Louise M. Burke, Jamie E. Gaida, Silvia Manzanero, David Hughes and Gordon Waddington, January 2019.
 "Impact of collagen hydrolysate in middle-aged athletes with knee and ankle osteochondral lesions: A case series", Fábio Krebs Gonçalves, August 2017
 "Improvement of Functional Ankle Properties Following Supplementation with Specific Collagen Peptides in Athletes with Chronic Ankle Instability", Patrick Dressler,Dominic Gehring, Denise Zdzieblik, Steffen Oesser, Albert Gollhofer and Daniel König, June 2018
 "Improved bone healing after oral application of specific bioactive collagen peptides", Knefeli HC, Mueller-Autz M, 2018
 "Specific Collagen Peptides Improve Bone Mineral Density and Bone Markers in Postmenopausal Women", Daniel König, Steffen Oesser, Stephan Scharla, Denise Zdzieblik and Albert Gollhofer, 2018
 "Manual therapy and eccentric exercise in the management of Achilles tendinopathy", Dhinu J. Jayaseelan, Michael Kecman, Daniel Alcorn and Josiah D. Sault, May 2017
 "Oral supplementation with specific bioactive collagen peptides improves nail growth and reduces symptoms of brittle nails", Doris Hexsel, Vivian Zague, Michael Schunck, Carolina Siega, Fernanda O. Camozzato, Steffen Oesser, August 2017
 "Effect of specific collagen peptides with various dosages on body composition in untrained men", D. Zdzieblik, S. Oesser, P. Dressler, A. Gollhofer and D. König, July 2017
 "Determination of serum biomarkers in osteoarthritis patients: a previous interventional imaging study revisited", Timothy McAlindon, Eckart Bartnik, Janina S. Ried, Lenore Teichert, Matthias Herrmann and Klaus Flechsenhar, January 2017* "Improvement of Knee Joint Discomfort in young athletes", Denise Zdzieblik, Steffen Oesser, Albert Gollhofer, Daniel Koenig, January 2017
 "Dietary Supplementation with Specific Collagen Peptides Has a Body Mass Index-Dependent Beneficial Effect on Cellulite Morphology", Michael Schunck, Vivian Zague, Steffen Oesser, and Ehrhardt Proksch, December 2015
 "Oral intake of specific bioactive collagen peptides reduces skin wrinkles and increases dermal matrix synthesis", E. Proksch, M. Schunck , V. Zague , D. Segger, J. Degwert , S. Oesser, December 2013
 "Oral Supplementation of Specific Collagen Peptides Has Beneficial Effects on Human Skin Physiology: A Double-Blind, Placebo-Controlled Study, E. Proksch, D. Segger, J. Degwert, M. Schunck, V. Zague, S. Oesser, August 2013

Awards 
 German Innovation Award. Excellence in Business to Business – Pharmaceuticals, Winner 2019 German Innovation Award, Fortibone January 2020
 Nutra Ingredients Awards. Ingredient of the Year: Healthy Ageing – Fortibone, GELITA – 2018, Winner 2018, January 2020
 Life PR Award: German Innovation Award in gold for innovative detergent additive Novotec CB800, June 6, 2018
 Nutraceuticals World: Top 100 Innovative Companies in Germany, Category "Innovative Processes"
 Cannes Corporate Media & TV Awards 2016: Four Dolphins for the company Video "You can see". Gold in category corporate videos and silver in the categories marketing films – B2B, information films and visitors films
 German Brand Award for successful brand management in the category "Industry Excellence in Branding", 2016
 "Intermedia-globe Award" in gold, World Media Festival June 22, 2016
 Frost & Sullivan Award, "European Health Ingredient of the Year" – 2008 New Hope, "GELITA Wins Frost & Sullivan Award European Health Ingredient of the Year 2008"

References

External links 
 Gelita AG
 Gelita Health GmbH
 Gelita Medical GmbH

Chemical companies of Germany
Companies based in Baden-Württemberg
Companies established in 1875
Manufacturing companies of Germany